Kjell Jakob Sollie (born 26 June 1953) is a Norwegian cross-country skier. He was born in Røros, and represented the club Ålen IL. He competed at the 1980 Winter Olympics in Lake Placid, where he placed 24th in the 50 km.

Cross-country skiing results

Olympic Games

References

External links

1953 births
Living people
People from Røros
Norwegian male cross-country skiers
Olympic cross-country skiers of Norway
Cross-country skiers at the 1980 Winter Olympics
Sportspeople from Trøndelag